Gezim Pepsi (born 12 July 1998) is a professional footballer who plays as a midfielder for Swiss Challenge League club Vaduz. Born in Switzerland, he previously represented Albania and Switzerland at youth international level, while recently represented Kosovo at the under-21 level.

Club career

Early career
Pepsi is a product of the Basel youth academy. He played for the U17, U18, U19 and U21 teams making a total of 99 appearances, scoring nine goals and assisting two. In 2018, Pepsi was loaned to Aarau as part of a partnership between the two clubs. Pepsi made 33 appearances for the Aarau. In February 2020, Pepsi told teammates he would be leaving Aarau, and subsequently was sold by parent club Basel to Winterthur.

Winterthur
Upon return from loan, Pepsi was bought by Winterthur in February 2020. His first goal for the club would come against Vaduz in June, the first match in the Swiss Challenge League since the COVID-19 enforced break. He scored against his former club Basel in the 2020–21 Swiss Cup round of 16, a game which Winterthur won 6–2. In May 2022, Pepsi was given a one-year contract extension with Winterthur.

Vaduz
On 30 August 2022, Pepsi joined Swiss Challenge League side Vaduz, on a one-year contract with the option of a further year. His debut with Vaduz came a day later in the 2022–23 Liechtenstein Cup round of 16 against Triesen II after being named in the starting line-up and scored his side's two goals during a 0–18 away deep win.

International career
On 3 September 2014, Pepsi received the Albanian passport and this paved the way for him to represent Albania, which he represented at under-17 level in the 2015 UEFA European Under-17 Championship qualifications, making three appearances and scoring two goals against San Marino. He switched to Switzerland and made eight appearances for the under-18 and under-19 teams.

On 11 March 2019, Pepsi received a call-up from Kosovo U21 for the friendly matches against Turkmenistan U21 and Malta U21. His debut with Kosovo U21 came on 26 March in the friendly match against Malta U21 after being named in the starting line-up, while the competitive debut came on 15 November in the 2021 UEFA European Under-21 Championship qualification match against Albania U21 again after being named in the starting line-up.

Notes and references

Notes

References

External links

1998 births
Living people
Footballers from Basel
Kosovan footballers
Kosovo under-21 international footballers
Swiss men's footballers
Switzerland youth international footballers
Swiss people of Kosovan descent
Swiss people of Albanian descent
Albanian footballers
Albania youth international footballers
Association football midfielders
FC Basel players
Swiss Challenge League players
FC Aarau players
FC Vaduz players
Swiss expatriate footballers
Swiss expatriate sportspeople in Liechtenstein
Expatriate footballers in Liechtenstein
Swiss Super League players
FC Winterthur players